Government Printing Office may refer to:

 Organisations

 United States Government Publishing Office, formerly known as the United States Government Printing Office
 Australian Government Publishing Service, formerly known as the Australian Government Printing Office

 Other
 Government Printing Office Workers, a set of sculptures at the United States Government Publishing Office
 Queensland Government Printing Office, a heritage-listed government building in Brisbane, Australia